The canton of Sainte-Marie-aux-Mines is an administrative division of the Haut-Rhin department, northeastern France. Its borders were modified at the French canton reorganisation which came into effect in March 2015. Its seat is in Sainte-Marie-aux-Mines.

It consists of the following communes:

Ammerschwihr
Aubure
Beblenheim
Bennwihr
Bergheim
Le Bonhomme
Fréland
Guémar
Hunawihr
Illhaeusern
Katzenthal
Kaysersberg Vignoble
Labaroche
Lapoutroie
Lièpvre
Mittelwihr
Orbey
Ostheim
Ribeauvillé
Riquewihr
Rodern
Rombach-le-Franc
Rorschwihr
Saint-Hippolyte
Sainte-Croix-aux-Mines
Sainte-Marie-aux-Mines
Thannenkirch
Zellenberg

References

Cantons of Haut-Rhin